Oliver Taylor (born 19 February 1938) is a retired Australian amateur bantamweight boxer. He won a silver medal at the 1958 British Empire and Commonwealth Games and a bronze at the 1960 Olympics.

References

External links

1938 births
Living people
Bantamweight boxers
Olympic bronze medalists for Australia
Olympic boxers of Australia
Boxers at the 1960 Summer Olympics
Olympic medalists in boxing
Boxers at the 1958 British Empire and Commonwealth Games
Commonwealth Games silver medallists for Australia
Australian male boxers
Medalists at the 1960 Summer Olympics
Commonwealth Games medallists in boxing
Medallists at the 1958 British Empire and Commonwealth Games